Abu Abdallah Muhammad b. Ahmad b. Muhammad Ibn Ghazi al-'Utmani al-Miknasi (1437–1513) was a Moroccan scholar in the field of history, Islamic law, Arabic philology and mathematics. He was born in Meknes from Banu Uthman, a clan in the Berber kutama tribe, but spent his life in Fez. Ibn Ghazi wrote a three-volume history of Meknes and a commentary to the treatise of Ibn al-Banna, Munyat al-hussab.  For an explanation of his work, Ibn Ghazi wrote another treatise (about 300 pages long) titled Bughyat al-tulab fi sharh munyat al-hussab ("The desire of students for an explanation of the calculator's craving"). He included sections on arithmetic and algebraic methods.
He is also the author of Kulliyat, a short work on legal questions and judgements in the Maliki madhab.

References

Further reading
Al-Hamza MH, Ibn Ghazi al-Fasi al-Miknasi and his treatise “The purpose of studying in explaining the desire of calculators" . Academic year-long conference IHST Academy of Sciences. M. 2005. pp. 299–301.

1437 births
1513 deaths
15th-century Berber people
16th-century Berber people
15th-century mathematicians
15th-century Moroccan historians
16th-century Moroccan historians
Berber historians
Berber scholars
Berber scientists
Berber writers
Kutama
Linguists from Morocco
Moroccan Maliki scholars
Medieval Moroccan mathematicians
Moroccan scientists
People from Fez, Morocco
People from Meknes
15th-century jurists
16th-century jurists